The Super Hero Squad Show is an American superhero animated series produced by Marvel Animation. It is based on the Marvel Super Hero Squad action figure line from Hasbro, which portray the Avengers, the X-Men, and various other characters of the Marvel Universe in a cartoonish super-deformed style.

The show is also a self-aware parody of the Marvel characters, with influences taken from on the comedic Mini Marvels series of parody comic books, in that the heroes tend to find themselves in comedic situations, and have cartoonish bents in comparison to their usually serious personalities (such as The Incredible Hulk being jovial and good-natured but with "major anger issues"), and is an overall comedic take on the Avengers. The series was produced by Film Roman and Marvel Animation.

Plot

Season 1
Prior to the beginning of the series, the villainous Doctor Doom attempts to acquire the limitless reality-bending power of the "Infinity Sword" in pursuit of world domination. Iron Man foils his plan, but the sword is shattered in the process, creating numerous "fractals" that rain down on Super Hero City.

Doctor Doom has since forged alliances with various supervillains, forming his Lethal Legion in order to hunt down the scattered fractals. Doom's forces, including his two primary henchmen MODOK and Abomination, dwell in Villainville, which is separated from Super Hero City by a giant wall. Opposing Doom's evil plan is Iron Man, now leading the elite team known as the Super Hero Squad, consisting of himself, Falcon, Hulk, Silver Surfer, Thor, and Wolverine. Marvel initially intended to put Spider-Man in at least one episode of the show, but Sony Pictures Entertainment (who owned Spider-Man's television rights at the time) appears to have chosen not to allow it. However, Spider-Man appeared in games based on the show and other tie-ins.

The Super Hero Squad is headquartered in the S.H.I.E.L.D. Helicarrier, and are frequently aided in their defense of Super Hero City by their boss Captain America, S.H.I.E.L.D. leader Ms. Marvel, rookie "Squaddie" and Wolverine's apprentice Reptil, and many more of their superhero friends.

By the end of the first season, the Infinity Sword is reforged when the supersized giant Galactus arrives to devour the Earth. It is later revealed that the Infinity Sword can be wielded only by someone who wields The Infinity Gauntlet. Silver Surfer rejoins Galactus as his Herald and leaves the team with the Infinity Sword in his possession. As of the aftermath of the battle, Villainville is destroyed, and his henchmen are arrested, except for Doom, who flees. A video game called Marvel Super Hero Squad was made although Josh Keaton who plays Moon-Boy in the series, now played as Spider-Man. It included other people with the same voices as well. This video game was made by Blue Tongue Entertainment, Mass Media and Halfbrick Studios.

Season 2
A second season focuses on traveling to different parts of the Marvel Universe, the galaxy, different dimensions, and through time. Thanos becomes the main antagonist for the first half of the season, seeking the six Infinity Gems to prove his superiority to Nebula and gain supremacy over the universe. He eventually gains all six Infinity Gems.

The squad's roster was changed in the season, due to Silver Surfer leaving the cast to once again become a herald of Galactus. Scarlet Witch replaces Surfer, with original squad members Iron Man, Hulk, Falcon, Wolverine and Thor returning. Thor receives his "chain armor" as a gift from his father Odin in the episode "Support your Local Sky-Father".

In the second half of Season Two, the Silver Surfer, who was corrupted by the Infinity Sword steals the Infinity Gauntlet from Thanos, takes over the universe, and transforms into the Dark Surfer, replacing Thanos as the main antagonist of the season. In the series finale, the Dark Surfer is defeated, the Infinity Stones and Infinity Sword are destroyed, and everything goes back to normal, though Silver Surfer has to pay his debt for what he did as Dark Surfer.

The second season premiered in the United States on October 23, 2010, on Cartoon Network to coincide with the release of its video game follow-up, Marvel Super Hero Squad: The Infinity Gauntlet.

Episodes

During the first season in the opening sequence of the show, there is a running sight gag similar to The Simpsons and The Fairly OddParents where the Hulk picks up an Infinity Fractal and is transformed by its power into something different every episode, such as the classic grey-colored Hulk, a toddler Hulk, a disco Hulk parodying John Travolta, a Hulked-out Wolverine, Bruce Banner, and a Hulk similar to Homer Simpson. This feature was removed in the second season. Additionally, each episode's title card is a homage to a classic comic book cover as are some of the episode titles.

Cast
 Charlie Adler – Captain Britain, Doctor Doom, Melter, Plantman, Sabretooth, Wrecker, Super-Skrull (season 1), Doombots, Cynthia "Coco" Von Doom, Phil Sheldon from Marvels, Hotel Employee Doombots
 Alimi Ballard – Falcon, Thunderball,
 Steve Blum – Wolverine, Heimdall (season 1), Zabu, Abomination, Fin Fang Foom, Pyro, Thanos (season 1), Redwing, Dro'ge
 Dave Boat – Thor, Thing, Uatu the Watcher, Trapster, Baron Mordo, Galactus' Mom, Captain Liechtenstein, John Porter of Damage Control, Adam Warlock, Dracula, Doc Samson, Man-Thing
 Jim Cummings – Thanos (season 2), Super-Skrull (season 2), Human Torch
 Grey DeLisle – Ms. Marvel, Enchantress, Volcana, Frigga
 Mikey Kelley – Silver Surfer/Dark Surfer, Iron Fist
 Tom Kenny – Iron Man, Captain America, Colossus, Juggernaut, MODOK, Fandral, Sentinels, Space Phantoms
 Stan Lee – Mayor of Superhero City
 Tara Strong – Invisible Woman, H.E.R.B.I.E., Scarlet Witch, Brynnie Bratton, Princess Anelle, Toro, Alicia Masters, Holoball, Baby Iron Man
 Travis Willingham – Hulk, Human Torch, Skurge, Piledriver, Hyperion, Zeus, Balder, Hans

Crew
 Guy Michelmore – Music composer
 Jamie Simone – Casting and voice director, sound supervisor

Production
The show's executive producers included Alan Fine, Simon Philips, and Eric Rollman, with Joe Quesada and Stan Lee as co-executive producers. Cort Lane was supervising producer. Mitch Schauer, creator of the Nickelodeon series The Angry Beavers, was the show's supervising director and character designer. Matt Wayne was the show's story-editor and head writer. Other writers include Michael Ryan, Nicole Dubuc, Atul N. Rao, Eugene Son, James Krieg, and Mark Hoffmeier. Novelty songwriter, Parry Gripp composed the theme song.

Head of Marvel Television and comic book writer Jeph Loeb explained the series as something everyone would like, stating "Marvel Super Heroes have always entertained fans of all ages in our comics, and we're proud to offer an animated series that families can enjoy together. With the most exciting super-powered adventures, The Hub can now offer the greatest fun of all—experiencing Marvel for the very first time. So whether you want to fly with Thor, suit up with Iron Man or smash with Hulk, this series has everything your family wants to see from our heroes."

Broadcast history
The show's first season was to debut on Cartoon Network in the United States on September 19, 2009, but aired five days earlier on September 14, 2009. The second season of the series, based on The Infinity Gauntlet, premiered on October 23, 2010, at 6:30am (ET) and stopped being shown on Cartoon Network on February 19, 2011, with episode 40 ("Fate of Destiny!"). Afterward, new episodes aired only on Teletoon and were available to purchase on iTunes. On July 23, 2011, the series returned on Cartoon Network, at a new timeslot of 12:00pm (ET). Although in the next following weeks no new episodes aired. In September 2011, Cartoon Network announced that The Super Hero Squad Show would be airing new episodes on weekday mornings at 7:00am (ET) starting Monday, October 3, 2011. The series ended on October 14, 2011. A total of 52 episodes were produced for the show. Hub Network began airing the series on January 30, 2012 as part of their daily weekday line-up and aired on Discovery Family until January 30, 2015. As a result of Cartoon Network losing the rights to the show, all Super Hero Squad content has been removed from the network's website except for video clips on YouTube. On January 3, 2020, both seasons of the show were added to Disney+.

The series first premiered on Teletoon in Canada on Sunday, September 13, 2009, at 8:30am (ET) as part of the network's Action Force block. The show returned on Teletoon on Sunday, February 6, 2011, at 7:00am (ET) for the debut of the second season. All 52 episodes aired in Canada, ending on July 10, 2011.

The series premiered on December 4, 2009, in Australia, on ABC3, in October 2009.

It was aired on Nicktoons in the UK.

A massively multiplayer online game, entitled Marvel Super Hero Squad Online was released to the public in April 2011. The game was heavily based on the Super Hero Squad franchise, with The Super Hero Squad Show'''s character designs returning. The game was shut down in 2017.

Home media

United States
Most of the episodes have been released on DVD across several volumes by Shout! Factory.
 The Super Hero Squad Show: Quest For The Infinity Sword, Volume 1, released July 13, 2010, includes episodes 1–7 from Season 1, as well as never-before-seen bonus features.
 The Super Hero Squad Show: Quest For The Infinity Sword, Volume 2, released November 9, 2010, includes episodes 8–13 from Season 1 as well as more bonus features.
 The Super Hero Squad Show: Quest For The Infinity Sword, Volume 3, released February 8, 2011, includes episodes 14–19 from Season 1.
 The Super Hero Squad Show: Quest For The Infinity Sword, Volume 4, released May 3, 2011, includes episodes 20–26 from Season 1.
 The Super Hero Squad Show: The Infinity Gauntlet, Vol. 1, released August 2, 2011, includes the first six episodes from Season 2 (episodes 27–32 overall).
 The Super Hero Squad Show: The Infinity Gauntlet, Vol. 2, released November 22, 2011, includes the next seven episodes from Season 2 (episodes 33–39 overall).
 The Super Hero Squad Show: The Infinity Gauntlet, Vol. 3, released April 17, 2012, includes an additional seven episodes from Season 2 (episode 40–46 overall) and a special promotional code for players to unlock "special powers" on the MMO based on the series and the toyline, Marvel Super Hero Squad Online.
 The Super Hero Squad Show: The Infinity Gauntlet, Vol. 4, released on August 21, 2012, includes the final episodes of season 2 (episode 47–52 overall).

United Kingdom
Five volumes have been released on DVD so far. Hero Up contains episodes 1–6, Hulk Smash contains episodes 7–11, Don't Call Me Wolvie contains episodes 12–16, Tales of Evil contains episodes 17–21, and Mother of Doom contains episodes 22–26. Home video releases of Season 2 have yet to be announced.

Australia
Magna Home Entertainment  released The Super Hero Squad Show: The Infinity Fractal War (Vol 1) and Titanic Team-Ups (Vol 2) on June 2, 2010, and The Lethal Legion Strikes (Vol 3) on September 8, 2010. Each DVD includes 6–7 episodes of the show, as well as character profiles. (Australian release). The final volume of Season 1, entitled Quest for the Infinity Sword (Vol 4) was released on November 3, 2010, containing the final six episodes of Season 1. Season 2 The Infinity Gauntlet  (Vol 1) is currently available. Infinite Thanos  (Vol 2) was also released on November 2, 2011.

Canada
Vivendi Entertainment under the named Vivendi Entertainment Canada released two volumes under the names of The Super Hero Squad: Hero Up, Squaddies (Vol 1) and The Super Hero Show: Titantic Team Ups (Vol 2), both released on May 4, 2010. A Vol 3 was announced to release on June 29, 2010. But to a conclusion the Vol 3 DVD never hit markets. Since this happened, Vivendi didn't release a Vol 4 DVD either. On September 28, 2010, Vivendi released a The Super Hero Squad Show: The Complete Season 1 DVD set containing an unnamed Vol 3 and Vol 4. It is unknown if there will be any Season 2 DVD releases.

In other media

Comic books

A four-part comic book series based on the show called Marvel Super Hero Squad was released in the fall of 2009. The series was a success and Marvel renewed the series in January 2010 as an ongoing series, now entitled: Super Hero Squad. The comic does not feature only characters from the show, but also characters outside the show. As of December 8, 2010, Super Hero Squad had a total of 12 issues released. No new issues have been released since, seemingly indicating that the comic book franchise has been cancelled. Trying to bring back the franchise, Marvel released a Super Hero Squad Spectacular where the Beyonder sends them to another planet with their Lethal Legion foes.

Video gameMarvel Super Hero Squad was released on October 20, 2009. Its sequel Marvel Super Hero Squad: The Infinity Gauntlet was released on November 16, 2010.

Miscellaneous
 In the Mad sketch Avenger Time, Iron Man, Captain America, Hulk, and Thor enter a reality from the Cosmic Cube that resembles The Super Hero Squad Show.
 In the Ultimate Spider-Man episode "Flight of the Iron Spider", Spider-Man and Living Laser are transported into The Super Hero Squad Show universe, where Living Laser is defeated by Thor.

References

External links
 The Super Hero Squad Episodes Guide on TV.com
 [missing] The Super Hero Squad Show''] on Animated Superheroes
 
 

2009 American television series debuts
2011 American television series endings
2000s American animated television series
2010s American animated television series
2000s American comic science fiction television series
2010s American comic science fiction television series
2000s American parody television series
2010s American parody television series
2000s American superhero comedy television series
2010s American superhero comedy television series
Television shows based on Marvel Comics
Marvel Animation
American children's animated action television series
American children's animated adventure television series
American children's animated comic science fiction television series
American children's animated science fantasy television series
American children's animated superhero television series
Animated television series based on Marvel Comics
Anime-influenced Western animated television series
Cartoon Network original programming
English-language television shows
Works by Len Wein
Australian Broadcasting Corporation original programming
Television series by Film Roman